Qazan or Ghazan is the name of:

 Ghazan Khan, the most famous Ilkhan of Mongol Persia
 Qazan Khan ibn Yasaur (died 1346), ruler of the Chagatai Khanate in 1343–1346